Francesco Fuoco (1774–1841) was an Italian philologist, economist and Catholic priest.

Some of his works were published under the name of Giuseppe De Welz, a banker from Como, who hired Fuoco as a ghost writer.

Works

References 

Italian economists
Italian philologists
19th-century Italian Roman Catholic priests
1841 deaths
1774 births
People from the Province of Caserta